Joshua Gregory Cole (born July 25, 1990) is an American politician. A Democrat, he is a former member of the Virginia House of Delegates, representing the 28th district which encompasses Stafford County, Virginia and Fredericksburg, Virginia in Northern Virginia. Cole is also a member of the Democratic National Committee since elected by the Democratic Party of Virginia at the 2020 convention.

Early life
Cole was born in Washington, D.C., and grew up in Stafford County, Virginia. He graduated from North Stafford High School and attended Liberty University for three years.

Career 
He worked for Liberty University and Richmond City Public Schools. He was also a pastor and is the president of the Stafford County NAACP. Cole has also had many staff positions in the Virginia Assembly. Between the 2017 and 2019 elections, he was chief of staff to delegate Kelly Fowler.

In 2017, Cole ran for the 28th district in the 2017 Virginia House of Delegates election but lost to the Republican Bob Thomas by 73 votes.

In 2019, Cole announced his campaign for the same seat in the 2019 election. He faced the Stafford County Supervisor Paul V. Milde, who had defeated Thomas in the Republican primary. Cole won with 51.8% of the vote. Cole was defeated for re-election in November 2021 by Tara Durant.

Personal
Cole is openly bisexual; his 2021 re-election won the support of the LGBTQ Victory Fund, an organization dedicated to electing LGBTQ candidates.

References

Living people
21st-century American politicians
1990 births
People from Stafford County, Virginia
Democratic Party members of the Virginia House of Delegates
Candidates in the 2017 United States elections
Bisexual politicians
LGBT state legislators in Virginia